Ponoka Industrial (Labrie Field) Airport  is located  southwest of Ponoka, Alberta, Canada on Highway 2A. It is owned and operated by the Ponoka Flying Club.

References

External links
Place to Fly on COPA's Places to Fly airport directory

Registered aerodromes in Alberta
Ponoka, Alberta
Ponoka County